STS-61-J was a canceled launch of NASA Space Shuttle Atlantis, planned for August 1986 to launch the Hubble Space Telescope. It was canceled due to the Space Shuttle Challenger disaster earlier in the year. The crew members were to be John W. Young, Charles F. Bolden Jr., Bruce McCandless II, Steven A. Hawley, and Kathryn D. Sullivan. All of the crew members except John Young, who was reassigned to an administrative position, later flew on the STS-31 mission. Young was replaced by Loren J. Shriver for STS-31.

Crew

References 

Cancelled Space Shuttle missions
John Young (astronaut)